Andrew Marshall Pettigrew  (born 11 June 1944) is Professor of Strategy and Organisation at the Saïd Business School at the University of Oxford. A British professor, he was formerly dean of the University of Bath School of Management. He received his training in sociology and anthropology at Liverpool University and received his Ph.D. from Manchester Business School in 1970. He has held academic appointments at Yale University, Harvard University, London Business School and Warwick Business School.

Pettigrew has published many academic papers and books that consider the human, political, and social aspects of organisations and their strategies in contrast to the purely economic view in which the main unit of analysis is the firm or industry as typified by Michael Porter. This is known as the strategy process school as opposed to the strategy content school.

He was appointed Officer of the Order of the British Empire (OBE) in the 2009 New Year Honours.

Early life
Just before leaving  Corby Grammar School, he joined a Brathay Exploration Group funded by the BBC and the Royal Geographical Society to Uganda, where he and 12 other boys worked with local archaeologists and social anthropologists. His own tasks were to survey the distribution of flat houses, particular to the northern slopes of Mount Elgon, and then to survey the spread of conical-roofed houses, as an indicator of the break-up or continuity of the existing culture. He later said of this trip that the "themes can be seen to resonate throughout much of my academic work".

He followed this work with a degree in sociology at Liverpool University and a PhD in industry sociology supervised by Enid Mumford at Manchester Business School followed by two years at Yale University at their Administrative Science Department.

He established and directed the Centre for Corporate Strategy and Change at Warwick Business School from the mid-1980s to mid-1990s. In 2002 he became the first non North American scholar to receive the Distinguished Scholar of the US Academy of Management award.

Key ideas

Writing about his 1985 book The Awakening Giant, which examines how best to explain the success and failings of ICI, Fairfield-Sonn (1987) says:

"Given the scope of the task Pettigrew sets out to accomplish the likelihood of success seems remote. Yet, the author artfully manages to combine the skills of business historian, methodological critic, and pragmatic counselor to produce a cutting-edge work that should be read by everyone who has an interest in organizational development."

Pettigrew's background in anthropology and sociology seemed to predispose his view that "an organisation's strategy is the result of a process embedded in a context" (2003b). He recalls how when he made his "way across then what was a fairly rickety (and in places non-existent) bridge from sociology by way of organisation strategy" such a view was "an unusual thing" since at the time "those with backgrounds in industrial economics ruled the roost" complete with their "overuse of simple distinctions such as 'strategy formulation' and 'strategy implementation' and 'strategy content' and 'strategy process' research.

Despite his intellectual preference for fewer distinctions between content, process, and context, he still tends to be viewed as a researcher in the process tradition simply because it, as he, is interested in more than static decisions. He argues (2003b) that:

 The link between formulation and implementation is not unilinear but interrelated time
 Understanding the change associated with strategy requires understanding of continuity over time
 Strategy, and its impact on future outcomes, are shaped by power and politics

This view of strategy requires the strategy researcher to be historian, anthropologist, and political analyst.

Views on methodology

Pettigrew considers his work to have been "to catch reality in flight" (2003b) such that human behaviour is studied in context and by locating present behaviour "in its historical antecedents" (2003b:306). He determines three benefits of such a longitudinal study:

 Length of time enables appreciation of decision-making in context
 Each individual 'drama' provides a clear point of data collection
 Mechanisms that lead to, accentuate, and regulate, each drama can be deduced
 Comparison and contrast is possible allowing continuity and change to be examined

He claims that "most social scientists do not appear to give much time to time" and that, as a result, much of their work is an "exercise in comparative statics" and therefore recommends strategy researchers follow the approach of historians to "reconstruct past contexts, processes, and decisions" in order to discover patterns, find underlying mechanisms and triggers, and combine inductive search with deductive reason.

Bibliography

 Pettigrew, AM, (1985), The Awakening Giant, Oxford, Blackwell
 Pettigrew, AM, (1990), Longitudinal Field Research on Change, Theory, & Practise, Organization Science, 1:267:92
 Pettigrew, AM, (1992), The Character and Significance of Strategy Process Research, Strategic Management Journal, 13:5-16
 Pettigrew, AM, (1997), What is a processual analysis, Scandinavian Journal of Management, 13:337-48
 Pettigrew, AM, Woodman, RW, & Cameron, KS, (2001), Studying Organizational Change and Development: Challenges for Future Research, The Academy of Management Journal > Vol. 44, No. 4 (Aug., 2001), pp. 697–713
 Pettigrew, AM, Strategy as Process, Power, and Change, in Cummings, S, & Wilson, D, (2003b), Images of Strategy, Blackwell Publishing, pp. 301–330

Footnotes

References

 Fairfield-Sonn, JW, (1987), The Awakening Giant: Continuity and Change in ICI, Industrial and Labor Relations Review © 1987 Cornell University, School of Industrial & Labor Relations

External links

University of Bath Profile
Buresund Profile
Profile at Oxford
Catalogue of Pettigrew's business research papers, held at the Modern Records Centre, University of Warwick

Academics of London Business School
Academics of the University of Bath
Yale University faculty
Harvard University faculty
Living people
Officers of the Order of the British Empire
People from Corby
1944 births
Alumni of the Manchester Business School